90 Urmia Football Club is an Iranian professional football club based in Urmia, currently  playing in the second tier Azadegan League.

The club was founded in 2011 and joined the Azadegan League in August of 2018, after the transfer of Gostaresh Foulad to the city of Urmia.

References 

Football clubs in Iran